Capsiceae is a taxonomic tribe of bellpeppers and related plants belonging to the Solanoideae subfamily within the family Solanaceae. The tribe was described by Barthélemy Charles Joseph Dumortier in 1827.

Phylogenomes 
Research from spacer data proved that the genera Lycianthes and Capsicum together form a highly supported clade that placed them in the tribe. Phylogenetic networks support placing the genera Capsicum and Lycanthes within a common bifurcating species tree.

References

Solanoideae
Asterid tribes